Harold Powell may refer to:

Harold Powell (footballer) (1915–1993), Australian footballer
Harold Powell (entomologist) (1875–1954), British entomologist
Harold G. Powell (1924–2016), American founder of the Harold's clothing store chain (1948–2008)

See also
Harry Powell (disambiguation)